Stuart Hoar (born 1957) is a New Zealand playwright, teacher, novelist, radio dramatist and librettist.

Biography
Hoar was born in New Plymouth and educated at James Cook High School, Manurewa, and the University of Auckland. He worked in the film industry as a sound recordist. 

In 1986, his first play, Squatter, was chosen for Playmarket's National Playwrights Workshop, was produced at Mercury Theatre in 1987, and published in 1988. Influenced by Brecht, Squatter explored the dismantling of New Zealand's large land holdings by the Liberal government of the 1890s. It was determinedly non-naturalistic, using placards, direct audience address, and anachronism to subvert the idea of a "historical drama"; Hoar stated that he was "determined to annoy people". His next play, Exile (1990), satirised founding figures of New Zealand literature.

The following year, Hoar was Writer in Residence at Mercury Theatre and received a Bruce Mason Playwriting Award. In 1993, Hoar received the Robert Burns Fellowship, and during his residence in Dunedin he wrote Not So Poor (produced at the Allen Hall Theatre), based on Mary Isabella Lee's autobiography, and Yo Banfa, about Rewi Alley's time in China, as well as a radio play and research for his novel Hard Light. From 1997 to 2000 he lived in England, during which time Hard Light was published.

While living in Menton as the 2007 Katherine Mansfield fellow, Hoar wrote Pasefika, inspired by the work of the French artist Charles Méryon who had lived in the then French colony of Akaroa in the 1840s. His 2013 musical, The Great Art War, was written with composer Philip Norman and is set in 1950; the plot concerns a dispute between the Christchurch City Council and the Christchurch Art Gallery over the purchase of a Frances Hodgkins painting. Three of his most popular plays have been biopics of New Zealanders, in a relatively naturalistic style: Rutherford (2000), about the scientist Ernest Rutherford, Bright Star (1995), about the  astronomer Beatrice Tinsley, and The Face Maker (2002), about the plastic surgeon Archibald McIndoe. His most recent play, Rendered, produced by the Auckland Theatre Company in 2018, deals with New Zealand's involvement in the politics of the Middle East.

Since the age of 24, Hoar has written over 30 radio plays which have been broadcast internationally. He has taught playwriting at Canterbury and Auckland universities, and currently works for Playmarket as their script advisor, and is a lecturer in the School of English and Media Studies at Massey University.

Plays
Squatter (1987) – first produced at Mercury Theatre, Auckland; published by Victoria University Press (1988)
Scott of the Antarctic (1989) – Allen Hall, Dunedin; published in No.8 Wire:8 Plays/8 Decades (Playmarket, 2011)
Exile (1990) – Allen Hall, Dunedin
A Long Walk Off A Tall Rock (1991) – NZ Drama School, Wellington
American Girl (1992) – Allen Hall, Dunedin; published in Three Radio Plays (Victoria University Press, 1989)
The Danger of Lifts (1992) – Court Two, Christchurch
Not So Poor (1993) – Allen Hall, Dunedin
Yo Banfa (Gung Ho) (1993)
Rutherford (2000) –  Circa Theatre, Wellington
The Face Maker (2002) –  Circa Theatre, Wellington
Bright Star (2005) – Circa Theatre, Wellington
Backwards in High Heels (2006) – Court Forge, Christchurch
The Great Art War (a musical, with composer Phillip Norman) (2013) – Court Theatre, Christchurch
Pasefika (2010) – Circa Theatre, Wellington, 2014
Rendered (2018) – Auckland Theatre Company

Screenplays 

 Lovelock

Libretti 

 Bitter Calm (1990) – first performed at the International Festival of Arts, Wellington, 1994
Star Fire 1995) – an opera for primary and intermediate age school children, composer Anthony Ritchie 
 Quartet (2004) – a chamber opera composed by Anthony Ritchie

Novels 

 Hard Light (1998), Penguin New Zealand,

Awards
 1988: Writer In Residence, Mercury Theatre
 1988: John Reid Memorial Award
 1988: Bruce Mason Playwriting Award
 1990: Literary Fellow, University of Auckland
 1993: Robert Burns Fellowship, University of Otago
 1993:  Best Screenplay, New Zealand Writers’ Guild Awards for Lovelock
 1995: Best Dramatic Production, Mobil Radio Awards
 2000: Writer In Residence, University of Canterbury
 2005: Writer in Residence, St Andrews College, Christchurch
 2007: Katherine Mansfield Memorial Fellowship
 2007: Best Radio Play, Radio New Zealand Awards for Attitude
 2010: Adam New Zealand Play Award for Pasefika

References

1957 births
Living people
20th-century New Zealand dramatists and playwrights
20th-century New Zealand male writers
21st-century New Zealand dramatists and playwrights
21st-century New Zealand male writers
New Zealand male dramatists and playwrights
People educated at James Cook High School
University of Auckland alumni
People from New Plymouth